The Intergalactic Collection ~ギャラコレ~ was a greatest-hits album released on March 5, 2003 by the Japanese hip-hop group, M-Flo, continuing the group's recurring sci-fi theme and containing singles from 2000's Planet Shining and 2001's Expo Expo.

Track listing
The Intergalactic Collection
How You Like Me Now?
Mirrorball Satellite 2012
Quantum Leap [DJ Watarai Remix]
The Cat Walk
Flo Jack
Chronopsychology
Hands
Come Back to Me
The PR
Prism
Been So Long
The Intermission
Orbit 3
L.O.T.(Love or Truth)
One Sugar Dream
Come Again
The New Vocal
Come Again... and Again!
The Way We Were (feat. Ceybil Jefferies)
The Rhyme Brokers
Incognito

References

2003 albums
M-Flo albums
Avex Group albums